Graeme Clark may refer to:
 Graeme C. Clark, Canadian ambassador
 Graeme Clark (doctor) (born 1935), pioneer of cochlear implants
 Graeme Clark (musician) (born 1965), Scottish musician

See also
 Graham Clark (disambiguation)